The Brand's Crossword Game King's Cup is the Thai national Scrabble competition in the English language. It has also been known as the Thailand International in the past. The tournament has been honoured to accept a trophy from His Majesty the King to award to the winning player in the most prestigious division. It is the largest tournament in the world, in terms of the number of players, drawing as many as 8,000 players.

In Thailand, Scrabble is promoted like a sport and as a way to learn English. The international players are honoured by the king. As a result, Thailand has produced two world champions as well as many top international players.

Results

 The Thai International tournaments are generally held around late June to early July
 † These two tournaments were held in January under different sponsorship

See also

World Scrabble Championship
World Youth Scrabble Championships
Canadian Scrabble Championship
National Scrabble Championship
National School Scrabble Championship

References

Scrabble competitions